Khandadevi  is a populated place and a ward (ward no. 7) of Khandadevi Rural Municipality. It was a village development committee before 10 March 2017. At the time of the 1991 Nepal census it had a population of 3,751 people living in 650 individual households.

On 10 March 2017, local level body of Nepal restructured into 753 units, thus this local level unit merged with other VDCs to form Khandadevi Rural Municipality.

References

External links
UN map of the municipalities of Ramechhap District
Ward No. 7 of Khandadevi Rural Municipality

Populated places in Ramechhap District
Wards and electoral divisions of Nepal